Richie Rich was a Saturday morning animated series produced by Hanna-Barbera Productions and was broadcast on ABC from November 8, 1980, to September 1, 1984, based upon the Harvey Comics character of the same name. The series shared time slots with Scooby-Doo and Scrappy-Doo, The Little Rascals, Pac-Man and Monchhichis over its original four-year broadcast run.  13 half-hours were produced, split into segments of 12, 7 and 4 minutes.

Many of the titles of segments were never revealed on air, but the titles were used in comic book issues then recently published at the time of production.

In 1988, the series was re-broadcast as part of the weekend/weekday programming block The Funtastic World of Hanna-Barbera.

Plot 
This show details the various adventures of Richie Rich, his family, and his friends.

Segments 
Richie Rich's adventures are sorted into different segments:
 Richie Rich Riches – This segment deals with threats to the Rich family or more specifically Richie.
 Richie Rich Treasure Chest – Segments that revolve around Dollar and/or Cadbury.
 Richie Rich Gems – Short segments for humor like the Wing Dings of Dastardly and Muttley in their Flying Machines.  These segments were based on one-page comic book stories.
 Richie Rich Zillion-Dollar Adventures – This segment deals with Richie Rich and his friends fighting master criminals, aliens, and other threats to the world. While Dr. Blemish appeared in one episode, some episodes have an exclusive villain called the Collector as a recurring enemy.

Adaptation changes 
The animated series took a number of liberties from the original comics:
 Richie is depicted as slightly older, inconsistently voiced as a child between 10 and 13, and wears a red sweater with a large "R" on the front as well as long trousers. In the comics, he wears a black suit with a red bow tie and blue short pants.
 Gloria is shown as the same age as Richie and wears a white long-sleeved a blouse, pantyhose, purple sweater or sweater vest and purple mini skirt.  In the comics, she wore a bow in her hair and wore a white blouse with a short skirt supposedly made of tartan.
 Dollar is more anthropomorphized with Walter Mitty-like fantasies.
 Irona the Robot Maid is given a greater presence in the series with additional duties as Richie's personal bodyguard as seen in the "Zillion Dollar Adventures" segments. To fulfill that role, Irona can convert her body into various alternative modes as necessary. For instance, the moment she receives a summons from Richie, she would change her body into a jet plane mode and immediately fly to the boy.

Broadcast history 
Richie Rich was originally broadcast in these following formats on ABC:
 The Richie Rich/Scooby-Doo Show (November 8, 1980 – September 18, 1982)
 The Pac-Man/Little Rascals/Richie Rich Show (September 25, 1982 – September 3, 1983)
 The Monchhichis/Little Rascals/Richie Rich Show (September 10, 1983 – September 1, 1984)

It later aired on CBS as reruns from January 11 to August 30, 1986, and then again from November 15 to December 27, 1986.

Episodes

Season 1 – The Richie Rich/Scooby-Doo Show

Season 2 – The Richie Rich/Scooby-Doo Show

Season 3 – The Pac-Man/Little Rascals/Richie Rich Show

Season 4 – The Monchhichis/Little Rascals/Richie Rich Show
 Only Zillion-Dollar Adventures were produced for this season.

Cast 
The voice cast included:
 Sparky Marcus – Richie Rich
 Christian Hoff – Freckles, Pee Wee
 Nancy Cartwright – Gloria Glad
 Stanley Jones – Mr. Rich, Cadbury the Butler
 Joan Gerber – Mrs. Rich, Irona the Robot Maid
 Bill Callaway – Professor Keenbean
 Frank Welker – Dollar the Dog, Dr. Blemish, Suavo
 Dick Beals – Reggie Van Dough
 Robert Ridgely - Collector

Home media 
On May 20, 2008, Warner Home Video released The Richie Rich/Scooby-Doo Show: Volume 1 on DVD in Region 1.

See also 
 The Richie Rich/Scooby-Doo Show
 The Pac-Man/Little Rascals/Richie Rich Show
 The Monchhichis/Little Rascals/Richie Rich Show

References

External links 
 

1980 American television series debuts
1984 American television series endings
Television shows based on Harvey Comics
American Broadcasting Company original programming
1980s American animated television series
The Funtastic World of Hanna-Barbera
Television series by Hanna-Barbera
Television series by Warner Bros. Television Studios
American animated television spin-offs
American children's animated comedy television series
Richie Rich (comics)
Animated television series about children